Matumbulu is an administrative ward in the Dodoma Urban district of the Dodoma Region of Tanzania. In 2016 the Tanzania National Bureau of Statistics report there were 3,789 people in the ward.

References

Dodoma
Wards of Dodoma Region